Tom Brevoort is an American comic book editor, known for his work for Marvel Comics, where he has overseen titles such as New Avengers, Civil War, and Fantastic Four. He became Executive Editor in 2007, and in January 2011 was promoted to additionally serve as Senior Vice President of Publishing.

Career
Tom Brevoort began working for Marvel Comics as a college intern in 1989. Commenting on his rationale for taking a non-paying entry-level job, Brevoort recalls, "Well, obviously, to get a leg up on getting into the business." Brevoort went on to say, "In the illustration program I attended at the University of Delaware, senior students were required to get and serve an internship at some company or institution related to the field of illustration. In our initial freshman orientation, the head of the department mentioned that they had previously placed one student at Marvel Comics, so I figured that was where I would set my sights."

Brevoort worked his way up to an assistant editor and later an editor in his own right. From 2007, he held the title of Executive Editor with Marvel and was responsible for multiple series including New Avengers, Civil War, and Fantastic Four.

In July 2010, Brevoort and fellow Marvel editor Axel Alonso began a weekly column on Comic Book Resources called "Marvel T&A", a new installment of which appears every Friday, along with Joe Quesada's "Cup O' Joe" column.

On January 4, 2011, Brevoort was promoted to Senior Vice President of Publishing of Marvel Comics.

As of 2020, Brevoort was Marvel's longest serving editor.

Awards
1997 Eisner Award for Best Editor (nomination, for Untold Tales of Spider-Man and Daily Bugle)

References

External links

 

 Tom Brevoort's Tumblr

Living people
Year of birth missing (living people)
Place of birth missing (living people)
Comic book editors
Marvel Comics people